Te Kao is a village on the Aupouri Peninsula of Northland, New Zealand. Te Aupōuri are mana whenua (tribe with traditional authority over a territory) over Te Kao and the surrounding district, and it is the principal settlement of the iwi (tribe). Te Aupōuri's Post-Settlement Governance Entity, Te Runanga Nui o Te Aupōuri, has an office at Te Kao, along with the iwi's marae and urupa.   State Highway 1 passes through the district. Cape Reinga is 46 km to the north, and Houhora is 24 km to the south. The Aupouri Forest and Ninety Mile Beach are to the west.

The athlete Te Houtaewa, of Te Aupōuri, started his legendary run along Ninety Mile Beach at Te Kao.

Demographics
The SA1 area is part of the larger North Cape statistical area.

The SA1 statistical area had a population of 225 at the 2018 New Zealand census, an increase of 54 people (31.6%) since the 2013 census, and an increase of 9 people (4.2%) since the 2006 census. There were 75 households, comprising 120 males and 105 females, giving a sex ratio of 1.14 males per female. The median age was 30.5 years (compared with 37.4 years nationally), with 57 people (25.3%) aged under 15 years, 54 (24.0%) aged 15 to 29, 75 (33.3%) aged 30 to 64, and 36 (16.0%) aged 65 or older.

Ethnicities were 22.7% European/Pākehā, 92.0% Māori, 9.3% Pacific peoples, and 1.3% Asian. People may identify with more than one ethnicity.

Of those people who chose to answer the census's question about religious affiliation, 20.0% had no religion, 45.3% were Christian and 29.3% had Māori religious beliefs.

Of those at least 15 years old, 9 (5.4%) people had a bachelor or higher degree, and 36 (21.4%) people had no formal qualifications. The median income was $20,000, compared with $31,800 nationally. 6 people (3.6%) earned over $70,000 compared to 17.2% nationally. The employment status of those at least 15 was that 66 (39.3%) people were employed full-time, 18 (10.7%) were part-time, and 9 (5.4%) were unemployed.

Marae

Pōtahi Marae, near the centre of Te Kao, is the traditional meeting place for Te Aupōuri, and includes the wharehui (meeting house) Waimirirangi and wharekai (dining hall)  Te Rongopātūtaonga.

In October 2020, the Government committed $220,442 from the Provincial Growth Fund to upgrade the marae, creating 9 jobs.

Education

Te Kura o Te Kao is a coeducational full primary (years 1–8) school with a roll of  students as of 

The school started as Te Kao Native School in 1881. It became Te Kao Area School, providing education up to seventh form, but with few secondary students it changed to become a primary school in 1999.

The school celebrated its 125th anniversary during Labour Weekend in 2006. It became a designated character school at the start of 2019, and extended to include years 9 and 10 in 2020.

Notes

Far North District
Populated places in the Northland Region